Mohamed Khelifati , better known by his stage name Cheb Mami (born 11 July 1966), is an Algerian musician and singer-songwriter. He sings and speaks in Algerian Arabic and sometimes in French or Eastern Arabic dialects.

Early life
Cheb Mami was born in Graba-el-wed (Arabic: غربة الواد), a populous quarter of Saïda (Arabic: سعيدة), Algeria. Located 170 kilometres south of Oran, the city is on the high mesas of northwestern Algeria.

Career

In 1985, Cheb Mami moved to Paris and discovered Raï music.
He later performed military service for two years in Algeria while working as an entertainer on army bases. In May 1989, he returned to Paris. He went on to tour the United States, the Netherlands, Germany, Switzerland, Spain, Scandinavia, and England.

Cheb Mami's music is a blend of Mediterranean and Western influences, including Turkish, Flamenco, and Greek music, as well as Latin music. His voice is tinged with Andalusian accents, and his music is an amalgamation of traditional and modern styles of singing.

International recognition
When Sting's album Brand New Day was released in 1999, the pair's duet, "Desert Rose", appeared on singles charts around the world and led to television appearances on Saturday Night Live, the Today Show, Jay Leno, David Letterman, the Grammy Awards telecast, and even a live performance at the Super Bowl.

Arrest, imprisonment, and release
Cheb Mami was under an international arrest warrant after being indicted in October 2006 for "voluntary violence, sequestration, and threats" against an ex-wife, and failing to answer a court summons on 14 May 2007. He was accused of attempting to force an abortion on his then-girlfriend, magazine photographer Isabelle Simon. During a trip to Algeria in the summer of 2005, Simon was locked in a house belonging to one of Cheb Mami's friends, where an abortive procedure was attempted on her. Afterwards in France, she realized the fetus was still alive, and she later gave birth to a daughter. Cheb Mami had accused his manager Michel Lecorre (a.k.a. Michel Levy) of organizing the abortion plan; Levy was later sentenced to four years for plotting and organizing the assault. Cheb Mami was arrested in France several days before his trial and taken into custody by officials at a Paris airport as he arrived in the country from Algeria on 22 June 2009.

In July 2009, a Paris court found him guilty of drugging and attempted forcible abortion, and sentenced him to five years in prison.

On 21 September 2010, his lawyers applied for conditional release, a request that was turned down on 12 October 2010. Upon a second appeal however, the French court agreed for his conditional release on 23 March 2011.

Plagiarism
In July 2015, Cheb Mami had to compensate 200,000 euros to Cheb Rabah (born Rabah Zerradine) for plagiarizing his texts. The songs in question are "Le raï c'est chic", "Madanite", "Ma vie deux fois", and "Gualbi Gualbi".

Selected discography
 Manetzouatchi (1985)
 Douni l'bladi (1986)
 Ouach Etsalini (1986)
 Le Prince du Raï (1989)
 Let Me Raï (1990)
 Lazrag Saâni (1991)
 Nahmek toujours ya taleb (1996)
 Meli Meli (1998)
 Dimari with Cheba Zahouania (2000)
 Dellali (2001)
 Du Sud au Nord (2003)
 Live au Grand Rex (2004)
 Layali (2006)

References

1966 births
Living people
Algerian emigrants to France
Raï musicians
World Music Awards winners
People from Saïda
Virgin Records artists
Rotana Records artists
A&M Records artists
Because Music artists
20th-century Algerian  male singers
21st-century French male singers
Algerian male film actors
Algerian male television actors